Tijs is a Dutch male given name. It can be a derivative form of Matthijs, which is the Dutch form of Matthew or Matthias, or a short form of Timothijs or Timotheus, Dutch forms of Timothy. Another spelling of this name is Thijs.

It may refer to:

Tijs Goldschmidt (born 1953), Dutch writer and evolutionary biologist
Tijs Tinbergen (born c. 1947), Dutch filmmaker
Tiësto (born Tijs Michiel Verwest, 1969), Dutch DJ

Dutch masculine given names